PAOK Kalou Choriou was a Cypriot association football club based in Kalo Chorio, Limassol, located in the Limassol District. It had 1 participation in Cypriot Fourth Division. The team is the theoretical continuitation of Kentro Neotitas Kalou Choriou "Commandaria" and Th.O.I. Agios Georgios Kalou Choriou.

References
 

Defunct football clubs in Cyprus
Association football clubs established in 1998
1998 establishments in Cyprus